Ak-Mechet (White Mosque) may refer to;
 Kyzylorda, called Ak-Mechet before 1853, a city in Kazakhstan
 Chornomorske, called Ak-Mechet before 1944, an urban-type settlement in Crimea

See also 
 White Mosque (disambiguation)